Salesian College is a Roman Catholic Independent school for boys located in the Melbourne suburb of Chadstone. Founded on the philosophies of Saint John Bosco, the college aims to offer a Salesian ideal of education.
Salesian comprises two campuses – Bosco (Years 7–8 & Years 10–12) being the school's main campus and Mannix (Year 9) catering solely for one year level. The reason for this is because of all the camps and student experiences in the Mannix campus (Year 9).

Salesian is a member of the Associated Catholic Colleges.

Timeline 
1956 – Three classrooms and hall built on a  property donated to Salesian's by Louisa Moroney.
1957 – Doors open with 61 students enrolled in Forms One and Two.
1958 – Fr. Fedrigotti, of the Salesian staff, was to become the first Provincial of the Australian Salesian Province and had his headquarters at Chadstone until 1964.
1958 – Three new classrooms were added and the enrolment reached 110 boys with Form Three added
1959 – Administration block was built, Form Four added, tennis courts were built and oval was extended
1960 – Another Form was added and enrolment reached 260. Chapel and science wing was also built.
1961 – Residential area built for Salesian staff. Form Six was added and enrolment passed 360. Furthermore, another wing with two classrooms, a kitchen, dining rooms and a shower block was added to the complex.
1969 – The B.M. Fedrigotti Senior Science wing was built.
1973 – College library plus three more classrooms were built.
1983 – Senior wing and administration offices was completed.
1986 – New residence was built separate from the school complex.
1988 – New complex with an assembly hall, a gymnasium, a sick bay, and three classrooms with associated offices and stores was opened. Also the Music and Drama wing was completed. This was built to mark the centenary of St. John Bosco's passing.
1995 – Technology Studies Centre was established.
1998 – New Computer Centre, Multimedia Laboratories, Minilabs and Special Education Area, as well as the provision of a Laptop Program. Intranet and Internet Access was established.
2004 – Numerous wetlands and water features built around the college.
2005 – Mannix Campus was completed.
2007 – Installation of $1 million worth of learning technology, including every classroom having Promethian whiteboards.
2007 – 50th Anniversary of School
2008 – Re-introduction of House System: Collinson, Annecy, Savio, Moroney.
2008 – Major renovation of the Mannix campus to cater for more classes.
2009 – Development of the Bosco Plaza.
2011 – Renovations to library and school chapel.
2013 – Renovations in the school hall.
2017 – Introduced a Sports Academy.
2020 – Introduced Literacy And Life, a combination of History and English.
2023 – Announced partnership with Liverpool FC International Academy Australia.

Sport 
Throughout years 7 to 10, weekly sporting activities are conducted and compulsory to students in those year levels. The college also offers a number of other sporting clubs, teams, trips and activities.

This sporting ethos is heavily embedded in the school life and has allowed the school to compete with many of the larger schools in the ACC.
 
   
Salesian has also gone back to the housing system of competitive sport in the school at the beginning of 2007. The four houses compete with each other in many sports, most notably swimming and athletics.

Salesian Old Boys Cricket Club 
Salesian Old Boys Cricket Club is a cricket club situated at the college. It currently hosts a Juniors Academy and several junior and senior teams. The club currently plays under the Southern Districts and Churches Cricket League.

Mannix Campus 
The Mannix Campus is a special campus, a state-of-the-art facility, dedicated to the education of students in year 9. This campus has a special staff to cater for the boys academic needs. The campus has two ovals, a science lab (only for the year 9s to use), a multipurpose room and a reception of its own. It also has an extra garden and an extensive gymnasium.

ACC premierships 
Salesian has won the following ACC premierships.

 Badminton (4) - 2016, 2017, 2019, 2021
 Basketball - 1999
 Cricket - 1971
 Lawn Bowls - 2018
 Soccer (4) - 1999, 2000, 2003, 2015

Curriculum

Music 
Music is an important aspect of Salesian College life. A host of various styles of bands are offered to the students to suit their needs. These bands will play often throughout the year in many of the college's assemblies, masses, plays and other music activities. The college bands have also been involved in many other major events including: Olympic Torch Relay, The ACC "ACCent on Music" inaugural concert, State Ministerial performances, the College's Annual Dinner Dance, Band Festivals and Eisteddfods. An annual band camp is also held during the year for the students involved. To encourage new students to begin an instrument, a free semester of music tuitions is given as part of the year 7 students curriculum. Once completed, students may elect to continue or change their preferences.

Bosco program
The Bosco program is a unit of study for Year 9 students that educates them about the environment, urbanism, community service and personal development. This gives the students a chance to explore the city and the environment of the community. Every Friday students are taught skills necessary for life, such as using Melbourne's Public transport system. They engage in hands-on activities that the students regard as "fun" and a "wonderful learning experience".

Biretta program
The Biretta program is an educational curriculum which was introduced to cater for boys with high intelligence. It does this through the implementation of challenging mental tasks, designed especially to promote growth in such areas. It began during 2010 and is still ongoing. The Biretta program is especially aimed at boys that don't want to go through the chaos of a standard classroom.

Notable alumni 
 Brendan Cole – 2010 Commonwealth Games 4 × 400 m hurdles relay Gold Medalist; 2012 Australian Olympian
Timothy Costelloe SDB – Archbishop of the Archdiocese of Perth
Frank Davis – AFL Footballer, Melbourne Demons (Melbourne Premiership Player 1964, Best & Fairest 1970)
 Simon Hammond – author, entrepreneur, journalist, business advisor and international keynote speaker

Kevin Morris – AFL Footballer, Richmond and Collingwood. (Richmond Premiership Player 1973 and 1974, Best & Fairest 1975)
Robin Nahas (2005) – AFL Footballer, Richmond
Dirk Nannes (1976–), professional cricketer

Steve Pantelidis – Soccer Player, Melbourne Victory and Gold Coast United (Melbourne Victory Championship and Premiership player 2006/2007 & 2008/2009)
Dean Rice – AFL Footballer, St Kilda and Carlton. (Carlton Premiership Player 1995)
Matthew Robbins – AFL Footballer, Geelong and Western Bulldogs
Gerry Wood – politician, Northern Territory MLA, representing the electorate of Nelson
Riley Collier-Dawkins- AFL footballer

See also 
 List of schools in Victoria
 Victorian Certificate of Education
 Associated Catholic Colleges of Victoria

References

External links 
 Salesian College Website

Catholic secondary schools in Melbourne
Associated Catholic Colleges
Educational institutions established in 1956
Boys' schools in Victoria (Australia)
Salesian secondary schools
1956 establishments in Australia
Buildings and structures in the City of Monash